Dubai Creek Golf & Yacht Club first opened in Dubai, UAE, in 1993, comprising an 18-hole par 71 championship golf course with a distinctively sail-shaped clubhouse. It was home to the first golf academy in the Middle East. The clubhouse comprises a number of function rooms as well as changing facilities and the 'Legends' fine dining restaurant. It is situated in the heart of the city, on the Deira side of Dubai Creek.

The club hosted the Dubai Desert Classic in 1999 and 2000.

The yacht club is based in a separate building and is home to the popular outdoor restaurants and venues, Boardwalk and QD's. To the creekside of the yacht club is a marina.

The 180-room boutique Park Hyatt Hotel sits between the two buildings and the grounds of the Creek Golf & Yacht Club are also home to the 92 villas that comprise the Dubai Creek Club Residences.

The Dubai Creek Golf & Yacht Club is also home to the city's only seaplane tour operator, Seawings.

Dubai Creek Golf Club hosted the World Golf Awards in October 2020. The awards serve to celebrate and reward excellence in golf tourism.

References

External links
Club websitesaqib. Com

Golf clubs and courses in the United Arab Emirates
Yacht clubs in Asia
Sport in Dubai